The Grand Army of the Republic Hall is an historic building located at 34 School Street in Rockland, Massachusetts, in the United States. The hall was designed by local builder William Harrison Hebberd, andbuilt in 1899 by members of the GAR as a memorial to the Union Army veterans of the Civil War.  It is a somewhat plainly decorated two-story wood-frame building with a hip roof.  Its most elaborate exterior feature is the main entry, a porch supported by clusters of narrow columns, and with brackets in its eaves.  The interior is more elaborately decorated, and has retained most of its original Queen Anne details.

On May 16, 1997, the building was added to the National Register of Historic Places.

Meetings
The hall was the meeting place of the Gen. George L. Hartsuff GAR Post No. 74, which was one of 210 post in the Department of Massachusetts.  It is now the meeting place of the Gen. George L. Hartsuff Camp No. 50 of the Sons of Union Veterans of the Civil War, the successor organization to the Grand Army of the Republic.

See also
 Grand Army of the Republic Hall (disambiguation)
 National Register of Historic Places listings in Plymouth County, Massachusetts
 Sons of Union Veterans of the Civil War

References

External links
  Hartsuff Post 74 Grand Army of the Republic Hall
 Library of Congress list of GAR posts by state

National Register of Historic Places in Plymouth County, Massachusetts
Clubhouses on the National Register of Historic Places in Massachusetts
Massachusetts
Buildings and structures in Rockland, Massachusetts
1899 establishments in Massachusetts
Massachusetts in the American Civil War